Kelo or KELO may refer to:

 Kelo, a wood art from Finnish and Russian Lapland
 Kélo, a city in Chad
 Kelo v. City of New London, a controversial U.S. Supreme Court decision regarding eminent domain
 the ICAO code for Ely Municipal Airport
 keloid
Kelo (J. J. Johnson song), a composition by jazz musician J. J. Johnson
In broadcasting:
 KELO (AM), a radio station (1320 AM) licensed to Sioux Falls, South Dakota, United States
 KELO-FM, a radio station (92.5 FM) licensed to Sioux Falls, South Dakota, United States
 KELO-TV, a television station (channel 11 digital) licensed to Sioux Falls, South Dakota, United States